Aethalina is a monotypic moth genus in the family Erebidae. Its only species, Aethalina asaphes, is found in Queensland, Australia. Both the genus and species were first described by Turner in 1902.

Former species
 Aethalina plumosa Wileman & West, 1930 now Feathalina plumosa (Wileman & West, 1930)

References

Hypeninae
Noctuoidea genera
Monotypic moth genera